Sterling Howard Emerson was an American geneticist. Emerson was awarded a Guggenheim Fellowship in 1951.

Life 
He was born on October 29, 1900 in Lincoln, Nebraska, the son of Rollins Adams Emerson. Emerson was awarded a Bachelor of Science degree from Cornell University in 1922, and admitted as a  Doctor of Philosophy from the University of Michigan in 1928. Emerson was the professor of genetics at the California Institute of Technology from 1928 to 1971. Emerson died on May 2, 1988, in Altadena, California.

References

External links
 John R. S. Fincham, "Sterling Howard Emerson", Biographical Memoirs of the National Academy of Sciences (1994)

1900 births
1988 deaths
American geneticists
Cornell University alumni
University of Michigan alumni
California Institute of Technology faculty